Mark R. Isfeld Senior Secondary is a public high school in Courtenay, British Columbia, part of School District 71 Comox Valley.

History
The school opened as Courtenay Junior Middle School in 1995, but was renamed in October 2001 in honor of Master Corporal Mark Robert Isfeld, a Canadian soldier killed in Croatia in 1994 while serving as peacekeeper. Isfeld was known for distributing small knitted dolls made by his mother to children he met during his tours of duty. It also became a high school, serving years 9 to 12. In the late 2000s this changed to 8–12 and an existing French immersion program moved to the school.

Athletics
Mark R. Isfeld Senior Secondary competes in Zone E (Vancouver Island) of BC School Sports. The  sports teams are:

Autumn
Aquatics
Field Hockey (girls' teams)
Soccer (boys' teams)
Volleyball (girls' and boys' teams)
Cross Country Running

Winter
Basketball (girls' and boys' teams)
Ski & Snowboard Team
Wrestling
The school won the BC provincial championships in girls' and combined snowboarding in 2009–10.

Spring
Badminton
Golf
Rugby
Soccer (girls' teams)
Track and Field 
Ultimate Frisbee
Mountain Bike Team

Notable alumni 
 Spencer O'Brien - Olympic/X Games Snowboarder
 Taylor Green - Former Milwaukee Brewers (Major League Baseball) player and scout

References

External links

Courtenay, British Columbia
High schools in British Columbia
Educational institutions in Canada with year of establishment missing
Educational institutions established in 1991
1991 establishments in British Columbia